Arthur Adam was the Chief Telephonist at Adolf Hitler's Wolfschanze HQ at East Prussia. Adam was a Wachtmeister (Master Sargeant) in the German Army.

Bomb attempt against Hitler 
When Colonel Count Claus Schenk von Stauffenberg carried out a bomb attempt against Hitler’s life on 20 July 1944, it was first supposed that it had been a time bomb left by the workers of the Todt Organization who had been renovating the bunkers in the period just before.

In the following hours, von Stauffenberg was not a suspect. Arthur Adam's telephone hall was next to the vestibule where Stauffenberg had left his cap and his belt.

At this time, the Chief Telephonist Arthur Adam who saw Stauffenberg running away from the HQ, leaving his belongings behind did not know what to do. He walked about the site of the explosion. It was not his duty to take part in the investigation, however, he wanted to tell the investigators what he saw.

He systematically tried to approach various army officers to report that he saw the suspicious Stauffenberg escapade. However, he was often called to attention and reminded not to raise suspicion against such a highly reputed colonel.

Adam did not give up his detective role and came to see  Hitler’s personal adjutant Heinz Linge to inform him that Colonel von Stauffenberg came out of the conference room and went straight into a car out of the HQ.

They end up telling the story to Martin Bormann, Hitler's Secretary and in the practice, the most powerful man in the Nazi Party after Hitler himself.

Adam tells Bormann that he is sure that Stauffenberg must have committed the attempt against the Führer's life, as he saw the colonel  leaving the conference in a hurry without his cap, his valise and his belt. Bormann does not hesitate for a moment and takes Adam directly before Hitler. When Hitler heard Adam's testimony, he is supposed to have declared: “Stauffenberg is the perpetrator of the attack! Arrest him immediately!”

For identifying Stauffenberg, Adam received a bonus (of 30,000 or 20,000 Reichsmark) and a (large or small) house in Berlin.

He is described to be the chief intelligence officer in the Chancellery of the Reich on 26 April 1945.

References 

Personal staff of Adolf Hitler
Year of death missing
Year of birth missing